Electoral history of Paul Ryan, United States Representative from Wisconsin (1999-2019), 2012 Republican nominee for Vice President of the United States, and Speaker of the House of Representatives (2015-2019). Throughout his career, Paul Ryan had never lost an election other than his defeat in the 2012 United States presidential election; of all the times he has won, he has never received less than 54% of the vote.

Wisconsin's 1st congressional district

1998

2000

2002

2004

2006

2008

2010

2012

2014

2016

Speaker of the House

2015

2017

Vice presidential nominee 

At the 2012 Republican National Convention, Paul Ryan was nominated for vice president by voice vote.

The Republican presidential ticket which included Paul Ryan as vice presidential candidate won 195,835 votes (51.65% of the vote) in Wisconsin's 1st congressional district.  This was almost 5000 votes fewer than his simultaneous congressional run, and a lower percentage of the vote than he won in any of his congressional races for that district.

See also
 Electoral history of Joe Biden
 Electoral history of Kamala Harris
 Electoral history of Mitt Romney
 Electoral history of Barack Obama

Notes

References

Ryan, Paul
Paul Ryan